The  is a zoo and botanical garden located at 2172, Funakoshi-cho, Sasebo, Nagasaki, Japan. It is open daily; an admission fee is charged.

The zoo opened in 1961, and now contains about 330 animals and 21,000 plants. Its rainforest greenhouse contains tropical plants such as the royal water lily.

See also 
 List of botanical gardens in Japan

References

External links
 Museum Directory entry (Japanese)

Botanical gardens in Japan
Zoos in Japan
Gardens in Nagasaki Prefecture
Buildings and structures in Nagasaki Prefecture
Tourist attractions in Nagasaki Prefecture
1961 establishments in Japan
Zoos established in 1961
Sasebo
Articles needing infobox zoo